Viga, officially the Municipality of Viga, is a 4th class municipality in the province of Catanduanes, Philippines. According to the 2020 census, it has a population of 22,869 people.

Viga is one of the eleven towns in the province of Catanduanes, located in the north-eastern portion of the island. It occupies approximately 8.96% of the total land area of the island and 0.0406% of the entire country. It is nestled in one of the widest inland plains of the island, between three neighboring towns and the Philippine Sea. To the south is the town of Gigmoto, to the west is the town of Caramoran.

History
The site of the original settlement of Viga was at Caviga-e now called Viga. It was believed that a group of tribesmen led by "Abines" from the mainland were the first settlers. Due to frequent Moro raids, they fled inland and settled in a place where the primitive inhabitants were akin to the province's pygmies. They called this place "Oco" (now barangay San José (Oco)), meaning short people or dwarf. When the Moro threat diminished, the settlers move to the lowlands where the soil was more fertile. They selected the area where herbaceous giant gabi-like plants which they called "Marviga" grew abundantly. The settlers were of mixed stock as result of the inter-marriages between the natives and the migrating tribesmen.

In the later part of 16th century, a group of Spaniards believed to be a group of Juan de Salcedo’s expedition reached the place and subdued the natives. It then became a Spanish settlement. An Augustinian friar named Francisco Putiocan became the first Catholic Priest and recognized leader. The Spaniards called the settlement "Viga", shortened from "Marviga". This name was subsequently adopted as the official name of the municipality.

During the Spanish colonization, the inhabitants were converted to the Catholic faith. As time went on they felt however, the strain of Spanish civil rule cruelties, when the Philippine Revolution broke out, many able-bodied natives joined the nationalistic movement and fought the colonizer.

When the Americans came, Viga was virtually liberated from the Spanish rule, civil government was established. When the Second World War broke out, Viga become the center of guerilla movement in the province. A pitched and running battle between the guerillas and escaping Japanese forces were simultaneously fought at Bangguerohan and Cabatangan where the latter was defeated.

In 1951, the barrios of Sicmil and Sioron were transferred to then newly created town of Gigmoto.

Geography

Viga is mostly rugged and mountainous terrain. Its slope characteristics are 29% gently sloping to undulating, 3% classified rolling to hilly, 18% very hills and mountains, 6% level to very gently sloping, 13% steep hills and mountainous, and 13% plains. The prominent mountain forms with important significance include the ranges are Summit and Magsumoso. The largest coastal plain is the contiguous wetlands over which lays the widest area of rice paddies and a vast swamp full of nipa and mangroves.
Viga is an agricultural municipality, considered as the rice granary of the province. The two types of agricultural products raised are the food and export crops. The food crops being raised are palay, corn, banana and other root crops. The export crops are mainly Abaca and coconut. The area planted with these crops and the production derived there from is the principal source of livelihood by the inhabitants.

Forest and vegetation
Viga is a biodiversity hotspot. Its lush rainforest is home to Philippine brown deer (Rusa marianna), flying foxes, and other endemic bat species, warty pigs, civets, cobras, giant pythons, monitor lizards, sailfin lizards and other endemic animals. Exotic bird species such as Philippine hornbill, rail, parrot, bittern, egret, pheasant, coot, lapwing, plover, Philippine duck, quail, owl, oriole, kingfisher, swiftlets and many more are also found. In fact, a record of "Philippines Birding Trip Reports" has found out many bird species in several portions such as the watershed and timberland forests reserve where scattered deer populations are also usually reported. Unfortunately, one bird subspecies, the Catanduanes Bleeding-heart (Gallicolumba luzonica rubiventris) had experienced over-exploitation in the late 20th century. Although most forests are still intact, this species has suffered over-hunting. It is very rare and believed to be near extinction or already extinct as its last reported specimen was collected in 1971.

The Southern giant slender-tailed cloud rat (budkon/bugkon) which is found only in Catanduanes and the southern half of Luzon Island, is still widely reported. It is critically endangered as humans hunt them for food and for some extent, as pets. In mainland Luzon, sightings of this wonderful creature is already rare while in Marinduque, it is generally considered extinct.

Flora and fauna
The Catanduanes narrow-mouthed frog (Kaloula kokacii), an arboreal amphibian which is found only in Catanduanes and some parts of Bicol, enjoys its diversity but being carefully monitored. Clearing of some forests may pose a threat to amphibian species. An amphibian Hylarana similis is found only in Catanduanes and Luzon islands. 
One of the very recent species found in Catanduanes and portions of Bicol region is the new loam-swimming skink, a legless reptile with its assigned scientific name Brachymelesmakusog. The rich dipterocarp forest also harbors numerous tropical plant species including the threatened species of pitcher plants and rafflesia as well as endemic banana varieties. Many highly valuable hardwood trees such as yakal, apitong, palosapis, and molave are still found in the forests though local reports indicate that these species are already threatened. Mangrove forests exist in several coastal areas, but the largest locations are in Banquerohan (Viga-Panganiban).

Marine diversity
The marine environment of Viga is also ecologically rich as its terrestrial zones. Coastal reefs harbor many endangered and threatened types of mollusks such as giant Triton, cowries, abalone, cone snails, conches, octopuses, squids, and nautiluses. Marine mammals are also reported to frequent on its coasts such as species of dolphins and whales which appear in March–June. Many edible marine algae such as caulerpa, valonia, and turbellaria also grow abundantly on its rough coasts. Viga is nestled in the very beginning of the Kuroshio Current; a sea current that runs through Eastern Philippines, Taiwan and Japan. This current performs an array of physical and biological functions in countless marine life like migration and breeding. This explains why migratory fish tracks are usually encountered in its waters. Tuna migration can be seen on its peak in the months of April and May. Dugongs were once known to swim on coasts but this event is already becoming extremely rare.

Viga coast is one of the best spots for flying fish population; a flying fish can attain its fullest size which may weigh 300 grams (11 oz). Rabbitfish, a kind of reef fish is one of the most heavily exploited marine tropical fish in the locality. Its fry that comes out in shallow coasts during the breeding season (March–May) are fished in large volumes. Approximately 10 million rabbitfish fries are caught annually. That natural event supplies food for many people but its ecological impact can be devastating. Nature advocates started to strengthen their campaign for an eco-dialogue for this matter. Sea cucumbers are also known to be abundant in many islets of the eastern coasts facing the Pacific Ocean.

Climate

Viga has a tropical rainforest climate (Af) with heavy to very heavy rainfall year-round and with extremely heavy rainfall in November and December.

Barangays
Viga is politically subdivided into 31 barangays.

Poblacion Barangays

 Asuncion Poblacion
 Peñafrancia Poblacion
 San Isidro Poblacion
 San Jose Poblacion
 San Pedro Poblacion
 San Roque Poblacion
 San Vicente Poblacion †

Interior Barangays

 Almojuela
 Burgos
 Del Pilar
 Osmeña
 Pedro Vera (Summit)
 Quezon
 Rizal
 Roxas
 Sagrada
 San Jose Oco †

Coastal Barangays

 Ananong
 Batohonan
 Begonia
 Botinagan
 Buenavista
 Mabini
 Magsaysay
 Ogbong
 Quirino (Abugan)
 Santa Rosa
 Soboc
 Tambongon †
 Tinago
 Villa Aurora

Demographics

Economy

Viga is an agricultural municipality, considered as the rice granary of the province. The two types of agricultural products raised are food and export crops. The food crops raised are palay, corn, banana and other root crops. The export crops are mainly Abaca and coconut. The area planted with these crops and the production derived there from is the principal source of livelihood by the inhabitants.

Education

Elementary schools

List of public elementary schools in Viga

National high schools
The table below contains the list of all the public senior high schools found in Catanduanes published by the Department of Education or DepEd. Included on the list are the municipalities, school ID, school names, and program offerings.

List of public/national high schools in Viga

References

External links

 [ Philippine Standard Geographic Code]
Philippine Census Information

Municipalities of Catanduanes